Statistics of Emperor's Cup in the 1939 season.

Overview
It was contested by 8 teams, and Keio BRB won the championship.

Results

Quarterfinals
Waseda University 6–0 Kobe Commercial University
Bosung College 4–0 Kwansei Gakuin University
Yonhi College 0–4 Keio BRB
Osaka Club 0–8 Imperial University of Kyoto

Semifinals
Waseda University 2–2 (lottery) Bosung College
Keio BRB 4–1 Imperial University of Kyoto

Final
 
Waseda University 2–3 Keio BRB
Keio BRB won the championship.

References
 NHK

Emperor's Cup
1939 in Japanese football